Rungoli (translation: A Colourful Pattern of Life, also transliterated as Rangoli) is a 1962 Black-and-white Romance comedy Hindi film directed by Amar Kumar. The film had Kishore Kumar and Vyjayanthimala in the lead with Durga Khote, Jeevan, Iftekhar and others appearing in supporting roles.

The film had music by the Shankar Jaikishan duo with Hasrat Jaipuri and Shailendra providing the lyrics.

Plot
Sewakram lives a middle-classed lifestyle in Bombay (India) along with his wife Subhagi, daughter Nirmala(Vyjayanthimala) and son Lattoo.  He works in the Flora Fountain branch of the United Commercial Bank. He is very organized, thrifty, and plans to get his children educated, married, and also build a house for them. Nirmala befriends Kishore Kumar Shastri(Kishore Kumar), who lives a wealthy lifestyle along with his widower dad, a Deputy, and runs two businesses for the supply of sand and cement. Kishore manages to impress everyone in Nirmala's family including her paternal uncle Sadhuram. Sewakram goes to meet Kishore to finalize their marriage and after doing so, he returns to the construction site and is gravely injured when an entire floor collapses. Nirmala finds out that the accident was Kishore's fault and refuses to have to do anything with him. Kishore attempts to woo her back, but before he could succeed, he is arrested by the police and held in a cell.

Cast
 Kishore Kumar as Kishore Kumar Shastri
 Vyjayanthimala as Nirmala "Nimmo"
 Durga Khote as Subhagi
 Jeevan as Sadhuram
 Nazir Hussain as Sewakram
 Brahm Bhardwaj as Doctor 
 Dhumal as Balabadradas
 Iftekhar as Police Inspector
 Krishan Kumar as Lattoo
 Sadhana Roychoudhury as Rani
 Jagdev as Mohabbat Rai
 Ulhas as Deputy Shastri
 Vrinda as Balabadradas' wife
 Fazlu

Songs
"Chhoti Si Ye Duniya, Pahachaane Raasate Hain" - Kishore Kumar
"Choti Si Ye Duniya Pehchane Raaste Hai" - Lata Mangeshkar
"Hum Tum Ye Khoyi Khoyi Rahe, Chanchal Isharon Se" - Lata Mangeshkar, Mukesh
"Ek Nazar Kisi Ne Dekha Aur Dil Hua Deewana" - Kishore Kumar, Lata Mangeshkar
"Jaao-jaao Nand Ke Lala Tum Jhoote" - Lata Mangeshkar
"Rangoli Sajaao Re, Teri Paayal Mere Geet" - Kishore Kumar
"Sagar Pe Aaj Maujon Ka Raaj, Bechain Hai Nazaara" - Lata Mangeshkar
"Hum Bechare Pyar Ke Maare, Aur Tum To Tum Ho" - Kishore Kumar
"Chaau Chaau Bombiyana, Ishq Hai Maraz Purana" - Manna Dey

References

External links
 
 Rungoli profile & review at Upperstall.com

1962 films
1960s Hindi-language films
Indian black-and-white films
1962 romantic comedy films
Films scored by Shankar–Jaikishan
Indian romantic comedy films